Anoigmaichnus is an ichnogenus of bioclaustrations (a type of trace fossil). Anoigmaichnus includes shafts perpendicular to their hosts' growth surfaces or tilted
(up to 45°); conical to cylindrical; circular to oval cross-sections; lacking separate wall. Their apertures are elevated above their hosts' growth surfaces, forming short chimney-like structures. Anoigmaichnus is the world's earliest known macroscopic endobiotic symbiont and it may have been a parasite. It occurs in the Middle Ordovician bryozoans of Osmussaar Island, Estonia.

References

Trace fossils
Ordovician animals
Paleozoology
Parasitism
Parasitology
Fossils of Estonia